= Javeria =

Javairia (Arabic: جافيريا) is a Muslim girl name of Arabic origin. It has multiple Islamic meanings; the most common being "Sharing happiness" or "One who shares happiness with others". It is also said to be associated with being a good and virtuous person. It is one of the English equivalents of the Arabic name "Juwayriyya" or alternatively "Juwayriya", the name of the eighth wife of the prophet Muhammad, who was a princess and was considered "The Mother of the Believers". It is usually pronounced with the first "i" being hard or soft, but can also be pronounced with the first "i" being silent. It is said that this name is also associated with the number "5".
